The Moara Dracului Gorge is a natural monument in Suceava County, Romania. It is a 60-70 m long and 4-5 m wide gorge with vertical walls, situated on the upper course of the small river Valea Caselor, a tributary of the Moldova.

References

Protected areas of Romania
Geography of Suceava County